Eucyclopera carpintera is a moth of the subfamily Arctiinae first described by William Schaus in 1910. It is found in Costa Rica.

References

Moths described in 1910
Nudariina